Balranald was an electoral district of the Legislative Assembly in the Australian state of New South Wales established from part of Lachlan and Lower Darling in 1859 and named after and including Balranald. From 1880 to 1894, it elected two members. In 1894, it was abolished and partly replaced by Deniliquin and Hay.

Members for Balranald

Election results

References

Balranald
Balranald
1859 establishments in Australia
Balranald
1894 disestablishments in Australia